{{DISPLAYTITLE:C19H32}}
The molecular formula C19H32 (molar mass: 260.46 g/mol, exact mass: 260.2504 u) may refer to:

 Androstane
 Etiocholane, also known as 5β-androstane or 5-epiandrostane